Island council elections were held in the Netherlands Antilles in 1963. They were the fourth elections for the Island Council.

Aruba

Three parties already present in the Council retained representation: the Aruban Patriotic Party, Aruban People's Party and Aruba National Union.

Results

Sint Maarten
General elections were held in Sint Maarten on 31 May 1963 to elect the 5 members of the Island Council. The result was a victory for the Democratic Party, which won four of the five Island Council seats.

Results

References

Aruba
Election and referendum articles with incomplete results